The Mandaue City College (MCC) is a government-recognized higher education institution in Mandaue, Philippines, established for deserving students, mostly graduates from barangay high schools, who have no access to education in mainstream private colleges or  universities. There is another school with duplicate name called Mandaue City College but is now known as Paulus Cañete College (MCC Basak), but it is not affiliated with this school.

This is the only CHED-accredited local government higher educational institution in the City of Mandaue.

History

The school was established by the Local Government of Mandaue through Ordinance No. 10-2005-324A, enacted by the 10th Sangguniang Panlungsod on September 27, 2005.  This ordinance was later revised on October 7, 2010 pursuant to SP Ordinance No. 12-2010-568.

Programs

References

External links
 Official Facebook page
 

Education in Mandaue
Universities and colleges in Metro Cebu